A ski lift is a mechanism for transporting skiers up a hill. Ski lifts are typically a paid service at ski resorts. The first ski lift was built in 1908 by German Robert Winterhalder in Schollach/Eisenbach, Hochschwarzwald.

Types 

 Aerial lifts transport skiers while suspended off the ground. Aerial lifts are often bicable ropeways, the "bi-" prefix meaning that the cables have two different functions (carrying and pulling).
Aerial tramways
 Chairlifts and detachable chairlifts
 Funifors
 Funitels
 Gondola lifts
 Hybrid lifts
 Surface lifts, including T-bars, magic carpets, and rope tows.
 Cable railways, including funiculars
 Helicopters are used for heliskiing and snowcats for snowcat skiing. This is backcountry skiing or boarding accessed by a snowcat or helicopter instead of a lift, or by hiking. Cat skiing is less than half the cost of heliskiing, more expensive than a lift ticket but is easier than ski touring. Cat skiing is guided. Skiing at select, extreme resorts, like Silverton Mountain, is also guided, even when skiing just off the lift.

Locations
 
Ski lifts are built in both the northern and southern hemispheres. 
Extreme locations of outdoor ski lifts:
 The northernmost is near Tromsø, Norway
 The southernmost is near Ushuaia, Argentina
 The closest to the equator in the northern hemisphere is near Liang, China
 The closest to the equator in the southern hemisphere is near Mahlasela, Lesotho

References

External links 
 

 
Articles containing video clips
Vertical transport devices